Mercy College of Health Sciences is a private Roman Catholic college focused on healthcare and located in Des Moines, Iowa. Established by the Sisters of Mercy in 1899, Mercy College bachelor's degrees, associate degrees, and certificate programs in the health sciences.

History 
In 1893, three sisters from Mercy Hospital in Davenport, Iowa founded a hospital in Des Moines, IA. Their first location was Hoyt Sherman Place and in 1899 Mercy Hospital Training School was established. This evolved into Mercy School of Health Sciences, from which Mercy College of Health Sciences was established in downtown Des Moines in 1995.

Accreditation 
Mercy College of Health Sciences is accredited by the Higher Learning Commission.

References

External links 
 

Education in Des Moines, Iowa
Health sciences schools in the United States
Catholic universities and colleges in Iowa
Nursing schools in Iowa
Education in Iowa
Tourist attractions in Des Moines, Iowa